Washington Prairie is an unincorporated community in Winneshiek County, Iowa, in the United States.

History
Washington Prairie's population was 14 in 1902, and was 20 in 1925.

References

Unincorporated communities in Winneshiek County, Iowa
Unincorporated communities in Iowa